Alive Till I'm Dead is the first studio album by the English rapper Professor Green, released on 16 July 2010. The album includes guest vocals by Lily Allen, Example, Labrinth and Emeli Sandé, among others.

Background
"Just Be Good to Green" was originally written and produced back in July 2007 when Green was signed to Mike Skinner's record label, The Beats. It was composed and produced by Semothy Jones, and at the time featured Neon Hitch on the chorus. When The Beats closed down, the track was put on hold, and later purchased by Green for use on his next record. Green spoke about how the collaboration came about between him and Lily Allen, saying that they began speaking through Facebook.

Green said, "We got chatting on Facebook and I mentioned the track, which turned out to be one of her favourite songs. She suggested her singing the chorus. I didn't take much persuading! Lily's wicked. She's straightforward and honest, you always know where you're at with her."

Singles
 "I Need You Tonight" was released in the United Kingdom and Ireland as the first single from Alive Till I'm Dead. The song features guest vocals from Ed Drewett. It was written by Professor Green and was produced by The ThundaCatz, mixed by Steve Fitzmaurice. The single debuted at number 3 in the UK Singles Chart and also did well in Ireland, where it charted at number 15. "I Need You Tonight" samples the 1987 rock/new wave song "Need You Tonight" by INXS.
 "Just Be Good to Green" is the second single from the album. It features guest vocals from Allen and was officially released on 25 June 2010. It has been released around the world. The song charted at number 52 in Australia. "Just Be Good to Green" samples the 1983 R&B song "Just Be Good to Me" by The SOS Band.
 "Monster" is the third single from album. It features vocals from Example and was released on 1 October 2010. Video shooting started on 8 September. The video was released on 17 September 2010.
 "Jungle" is the fourth single from the album. It features guest vocals from Maverick Sabre and was released on 20 December. It peaked at 31 on the UK Singles Chart and 9 on the UK R&B Chart.

Commercial performance
The album debuted at No. 2 on the UK Albums Chart. By 6 September 2014, the album had sold 250,000 copies in UK.

Reception
Alive Till I'm Dead received positive reviews from music critics, with BBC Music describing the album as "fizzy, dramatic and inventive as pop should be without losing his initial grime edge". Paul MacInnes of The Guardian gave a similar review, agreeging that it was "Pop music, yes, but sparky and cleverly composed pop that still has an ear for the club". He also remarked that Professor Green has a "flow like an estuary Eminem and a humorous sensibility reminiscent of Lily Allen".

Helen Clarke of MusicOMH also praised the album, also comparing Professor Green with Eminem, saying that "Alive Till I'm Dead grabs you like the first few times you heard The Slim Shady LP". She also wrote that the album was a "ball of tightly wound bitterness, anger and aggression", while also managing to be "cheeky, playful and almost frighteningly confident and experimental". Jesal Padania of RapReviews gave a positive review, tempered with a feeling that Professor Green is "so much more" than what his record label have allowed him to display thus far.

Track listing

Charts

Weekly charts

Year-end charts

Certifications

References

2010 debut albums
Virgin Records albums
Professor Green albums
Albums produced by Labrinth
Albums produced by Semothy Jones
Albums produced by Naughty Boy